Moruxlu (also, Morukhlu) is a village in the Gadabay Rayon of Azerbaijan.  The village forms part of the municipality of Samanlıq.

In 2000, it incorporated the nearby village of Tərs yer.

References 

Populated places in Gadabay District